Year 199 (CXCIX) was a common year starting on Monday (link will display the full calendar) of the Julian calendar. At the time, it was sometimes known as year 952 Ab urbe condita. The denomination 199 for this year has been used since the early medieval period, when the Anno Domini calendar era became the prevalent method in Europe for naming years.

Events 
 By place 
 Roman Empire 
 Mesopotamia is partitioned into two Roman provinces divided by the Euphrates, Mesopotamia and Osroene.
 Emperor Septimius Severus lays siege to the city-state Hatra in Central-Mesopotamia, but fails to capture the city despite breaching the walls.
 Two new legions, I Parthica and III Parthica, are formed as a permanent garrison.

 China 
 Battle of Yijing: Chinese warlord Yuan Shao defeats Gongsun Zan.  

 Korea 
 Geodeung succeeds Suro of Geumgwan Gaya, as king of the Korean kingdom of Gaya (traditional date).

 By topic 
 Religion 
 Pope Zephyrinus succeeds Pope Victor I, as the 15th pope.

Births

Deaths 
 February 7 
 Gao Shun, Chinese general and advisor
 Lü Bu, Chinese general and warlord
 Chen Ji, Chinese official, scholar and politician
 Gongsun Zan, Chinese general and warlord
 Qin Yilu (or Qin Yi), Chinese general
 Suro of Geumgwan Gaya, Korean ruler 
 Tian Kai, Chinese official and general 
 Yuan Shu, Chinese general and warlord

References